Alfredo Moreno Cano (born ) is a Spanish male  track cyclist, riding for the national team. He competed in the team sprint event at the 2010 UCI Track Cycling World Championships.

References

External links
 Profile at cyclingarchives.com

1981 births
Living people
Spanish track cyclists
Spanish male cyclists
Place of birth missing (living people)
Sportspeople from Ceuta